Antona diffinis is a moth of the subfamily Arctiinae first described by Francis Walker in 1865. It is found in Trinidad, British Guiana and the Brazilian states of Pará and Espírito Santo.

References

Lithosiini
Moths described in 1865
Moths of the Caribbean
Moths of South America